Chuck Smith may refer to:

Chuck Smith (pastor) (1927–2013), Protestant pastor and founder of Calvary Chapel
Chuck Smith (businessman) (born 1940s), retired President and CEO of AT&T West
Chuck Smith (athlete) (born 1949), American sprinter
Chuck Smith (American football coach) (born 1957), American football coach
Chuck Smith (baseball) (born 1969), former pitcher in Major League Baseball
Chuck Smith (defensive end) (born 1969), former NFL defensive lineman
Chuck Smith (Florida politician) (born 1928), American politician in Florida
Chuck Smith (Kansas politician) (born 1951), American politician in the Kansas House of Representatives
Chuck Smith (filmmaker), New York-based documentary filmmaker and author

See also
Charles Smith (disambiguation)